Igor Tasković (Serbian Cyrillic: Игор Тасковић; born 4 January 1982) is a Serbian footballer who plays for German club SV Thürnthenning.

Career
Educated in Radnički's academy, Tasković played 21 league games with them before moving to FK Obilić in 2003.

He joined Makedonska Prva Liga club FK Bregalnica Štip in July 2004 for an undisclosed fee. Tasković quickly became part of the main team. While at Bregalnica, Tasković became linked with all two main Macedonian outfits (FK Vardar and Makedonija Gjorče Petrov), but decided to play for Bulgarian FC Marek Dupnitsa, signing a two-a-half-year contract after the half of 2006–07 season.

In 2008, he was loaned for six months in Montenegrin FK Jezero before joining PFC Beroe Stara Zagora on 1 July 2009 from FC Marek Dupnitsa. After a brief spell with PFC Montana in 2010, Tasković moved to FK Napredak Kruševac and played with FC Black Stars Basel in Switzerland before joining Víkingur Reykjavík in February 2013.

External links
 
 Profile at Beroe official site

1982 births
Living people
Sportspeople from Niš
Serbian footballers
Serbian expatriate footballers
Association football defenders
FK Radnički Niš players
PFC Marek Dupnitsa players
PFC Beroe Stara Zagora players
FC Montana players
FK Napredak Kruševac players
Knattspyrnufélagið Víkingur players
FK Jezero players
FK Obilić players
FK Bregalnica Štip players
FC Black Stars Basel players
Ungmennafélagið Fjölnir players
First Professional Football League (Bulgaria) players
Serbian expatriate sportspeople in Bulgaria
Serbian expatriate sportspeople in North Macedonia
Serbian expatriate sportspeople in Montenegro
Serbian expatriate sportspeople in Switzerland
Serbian expatriate sportspeople in Iceland
Serbian expatriate sportspeople in Germany
Expatriate footballers in Bulgaria
Expatriate footballers in North Macedonia
Expatriate footballers in Montenegro
Expatriate footballers in Switzerland
Expatriate footballers in Iceland
Expatriate footballers in Germany